The 1934 United States Senate election in Michigan was held on November 6, 1934.

Republican Senator Arthur Vandenberg was re-elected to a second consecutive term over Democrat Frank Picard.

Democratic primary

Candidates
Claude Carney, candidate for Governor in 1932
Alva M. Cummins, attorney and perennial candidate
Frank Picard, former Saginaw City Attorney and World War I veteran
Ray D. Schneider

Results

General election

Results

See also 
 1934 United States Senate elections

References 

1934
Michigan
United States Senate